Vitaly de Gzell (1908-1977) was a Russian-Australian architect, who practised in Queensland in the modernist tradition.

Early life 
Vitaly de Gzell was born on 21 December 1908 in Harbin, China to Russian parents, Alexander Gzell and his wife. He was their only child. They emigrated to Australia in 1925 and Vitaly became an Australian citizen in 1935. Alexander Gzell was a furniture maker after emigrating to Australia.

Gzell completed his education in Brisbane and then proceeded to undertake a Diploma in Architecture from the Brisbane Central Technical College, graduating in 1933.

Career 
Gzell began work as a draughtsman with Godfrey A. Blackburne after his graduation. He was not yet a British citizen. Gzell was made a partner in 1934 with the firm going by the name Blackburne & Gzell architects. Each architect served in the military during World War II.

They dissolved their partnership in 1953 and Gzell operated his own architectural firm from 1953-1974. He was also a keen furniture maker who displayed his works in the homes he designed.

War Service 
He served in the Australian Army during World War II, demobilising with the rank of Major.

Notable designs 
Work as Blackburne & Gzell

 Dunk Island Tourist Resort (1935)
 Schureck home, Eblin Drive, Hamilton (1936)
 54 Highland Terrace, St Lucia (1936)
Bellevue Court, Clayfield (1937)
Mathers House, Holland Park (1937)
Dorchester Inn, Spring Hill (1938)
 Remodelling of Christie's Cafe, 217-219 Queen Street, Brisbane (c.1938) - it features Gzell's gazelle motif.
 Read Press Building, Fortitude Valley (1939)
Hinda aka Rialto Lodge, Coorparoo (1940)
Estia Court, Highgate Hill (1940)
Alexia House, Spring Hill (1940)
 Gzell's home, 25 Aston Street, Toowong (1946–47)
 Chester Estate No. 2 at Mt Gravatt (10 houses) (1948)

Work as sole architect

 11 Tarcoola Street, St Lucia (1957)
7 Herbert Street, Toowong (1957)
 The Mawby Residence, Langside Road, Hamilton (1958)
 ‘Lumeah’, Bina Avenue, Indooroopilly (1959)
421 Brookfield Road, Kenmore Hills (1965)
 Twelfth Night Theatre, Bowen Hills (1969)
12 Burgess Street, Kings Beach

Later life 
In his later years Gzell was well known for hosting art exhibitions and concerts in his home, Usonia (now demolished). This home had been designed for presentation to prospective clients.

Awards and memberships 

 President, Twelfth Night Theatre
 Founding member, Brisbane Symphony Orchestra
 Fellow of the Royal Australian Institute of Architects, 1961

Personal life 
Gzell married Lorna Martin in 1936. He died on 17 April 1977. They had three children, Barbara, Ian and Julie.

Legacy 
Correspondence relating to his architectural work is located in the University of Queensland Fryer Library.

References 

Architects from Queensland
1908 births
1977 deaths
Chinese emigrants to Australia